The following table lists most rivers of Sri Lanka. Since Sri Lanka is a trilingual country, some rivers may have a Sinhala name (i.e. Kalu Ganga), while other have an English name (i.e. Kelani River). In the Sinhala language, Ganga (ගඟ) translates to "river", where as Oya (ඔය) translates to "smaller river". At , the Mahaweli River is the longest river in the island, and has drainage basin covering more than one-fifth of the island.

List of major rivers (over 100km in length)

List of minor rivers (up to 100km in length)

Malala oya - Hambanthota District
karanda Oya - Potuvil Ampara District
Heda Oya  - Arugambay (Arunagamthota), Ampare District
wil oya - Ampara District

Gallery

See also 

 List of dams and reservoirs in Sri Lanka
 List of waterfalls in Sri Lanka

References 

Sri Lanka
Rivers